WDHT (102.9 FM "Hot 102.9") is an urban-leaning rhythmic contemporary radio station in Urbana, Ohio serving the Dayton/Springfield area that broadcasts on the 102.9 frequency. WDHT is currently owned by Alpha Media, which also owns WING, WROU-FM, WCLI-FM and WGTZ. Its transmitter site on Miller Road in Springfield is shared with that of WULM as this was previously the transmitting site of the former WBLY/WAZU. WUFM ("Radio U") based in Columbus also operates a Springfield translator (W254BJ at 98.7) from the same tower site.  Its studios are in Kettering, Ohio.

History

MOR (1958-1979) 
Prior to becoming WDHT, the 102.9 frequency was originally licensed to Springfield as WBLY-FM from 1958 to 1979, simulcasting MOR-formatted WBLY.

Album rock (1979-1993) 
In the late 1970s, the station changed their call letters to WAZU under their brand spanking new name "WAZU, The New FM 103 The Zoo...from W to A to Z to U!" The station played AOR and sometimes they also played AC as well. Then in the mid to the late 1980s they renamed their moniker as "Rockradio FM 103 WAZU" and then later as "102.9 WAZU". On January 15, 1989 the station briefly went dark and when they returned to the airwaves later that day they become a fully fledged AOR format and began calling themselves "102.9 WAZU, The Big Wazoo!" the highly successful AOR format ran until March 19, 1993 by which time the station had evolved into a harder edged AR format.

Classic rock (1993-2001) 
WAZU flipped their format to CR as "Classic Rock 102.9 The All New WAZU, The Big Wazoo!" (In between the flip from Active Rock to Classic Rock, WAZU briefly stunted as "102.9 WZEP-All Led Zeppelin, All The Time"). In 1992, WAZU was sold to Osborn Communications by Robert "Smilin' Bob" Yountz's Champion City Broadcasting, owners of the former WBLY (now WULM), and moved the studios to Dayton. WAZU's studios were originally located in its city of license of Springfield. After then owner Great Trails Broadcasting dropped the iconic WAZU calls in May 1995 the WAZU calls moved to 107.1 FM licensed to Circleville, south of Columbus in late 1996. They also used their moniker as  "107.1 The New WAZU, The Big Wazoo!" along with their Active Rock format as well as using exactly the same imaging as 102.9 did in early 1993. (That station is now WJYD with an urban gospel format). During their run as an AOR station WAZU competed fiercely with WTUE. The 102.9 frequency changed their calls to WING-FM in May 1995 and continued the Classic Rock format.

Rhythmic (2001-present) 

In 2001, Radio One acquired WING and flipped it to Rhythmic Contemporary on August 3 of that year. The station changed call letters to WDHT on October 24 to match the "Hot" moniker. Two years later, Radio One bought out rival urban station WROU, which was Dayton's last locally owned FM radio station, and was converted to Urban Adult Contemporary, a move that allowed WDHT to evolve into a Mainstream Urban direction, even though its presentation is more along the lines of that of a Churban-formatted station (like WPGC-FM/Washington, D.C.).

Under Radio One, WDHT was known for voice-tracking programming and repetition of songs in their playlists, which tends to favor Churban-friendly Rhythmic hits, but since the change in ownership to Main Line in 2007 and later on to its new owner Alpha Media in 2014, it has taken on a more live and local presentation. Also, in the wake of Top 40 sister station WGTZ's flip to Adult Hits, it has also taken on a more broader Rhythmic direction than ever, which might be due to the competition it has with rival Top 40 WDKF, whose direction leaned Rhythmic. The station also aired the Russ Parr morning show, which was dropped in August 2014 in favor of "The Breakfast Club." By September 2009, WDHT was officially moved from the R&B/Hip-Hop panel to the Rhythmic Airplay Panel by Nielsen BDS as it began to incorporate more Rhythmic Pop tracks into its playlist. The move to Rhythmic might have been spurred by WDKF's decision to shift away from a local presentation to adopting Clear Channel's Premium Choice presentation. That approach, of course, would result in WDKF being dropped from both Mediabase and BDS Top 40 reporting panels in 2009, only to be reinstated in 2013 when it began re-adding air staffers.

In 2006, Radio One announced that sister station WKSW would relocate its frequency from 101.7 to 101.5 and change its city of licence from Urbana to Enon. The move was later approved by the FCC. As part of a trade off, WDHT switched its city of license from Springfield to Urbana in 2010, but the station's transmitter remained in Springfield after WKSW's move. This move was planned before Radio One sold its Dayton area cluster to Main Line.

On May 17, 2007, Philadelphia-based Main Line Broadcasting announced the acquisition of Radio One's stations in the Dayton and Louisville market areas. Main Line took over the Dayton stations on September 14, 2007. In 2014 Main Line would be acquired by Alpha Media, thus becoming the new owners of WDHT and its sister stations in the Dayton cluster.

References

External links
Hot 102.9

DHT
Rhythmic contemporary radio stations in the United States
Radio stations established in 1958
1958 establishments in Ohio
Alpha Media radio stations